Ashley is the surname of:

 Alicia Ashley (born 1967), Jamaican-American boxer, former WBC world champion
 April Ashley (1935–2021), English model outed as a transgender woman
 Bernard Ashley (businessman) (1926–2009), British businessman and engineer, husband of Laura Ashley
 Bernard Ashley (author) (born 1935), British author of children's books
 Bob Ashley (born 1953), American state senator
 Charles Ashley (disambiguation)
 Chester Ashley (1790–1848), American senator from Arkansas
 Clarence Ashley (1895–1967), American musician and singer
 Delos R. Ashley (1828–1873), American state senator
 Elizabeth Ashley, stage name of American actress Elizabeth Ann Cole (born 1971)
 Elizabeth Ashley (scientist), British physician and medical researcher
 Evelyn Ashley (1836–1907), British barrister and politician
 Francis Ashley (1569–1635), English lawyer and politician
 Francis Noel Ashley (1884–1976), British colonial administrator
 Jack Ashley, Baron Ashley of Stoke (1922–2012), British politician
 Jack Ashley (Australian footballer) (1890–1968), Australian rules footballer
 Jack Ashley (footballer, born 1912) (1912–1992), English footballer
 James Ashley (politician) (1940–2006), Lord Mayor of Manchester, England
 James Mitchell Ashley (1824–1896), American politician
 James Ashley (1958–1998), Englishman shot dead by Sussex Police - see Shooting of James Ashley
 John Ashley (disambiguation)
 Kat Ashley (c. 1502–1565), first close friend, governess and Lady of the Bedchamber to Queen Elizabeth I of England
 Laura Ashley (1925–1985), Welsh fashion designer and businesswoman
 Maurice Ashley (born 1966), Jamaican-American chess player, author, and commentator, first black Grandmaster
 Michael Ashley (astronomer), Australian astronomer
 Mike Ashley (businessman) (born 1964), English billionaire owner of various sports-related shop chains
 Mike Ashley (writer) (born 1948), British researcher and editor of science fiction & dark fantasy
 Ossama Ashley (born 2000), English footballer
 Richard Ashley (musician) (1774–1836), English musician
 Richard Ashley (cricketer) (1902–1974), British cricketer
 Richard K. Ashley, American international relations scholar
 Robert Ashley (disambiguation)
 Simone Ashley, stage name of British actress Simone Ashwini Pillai (born 1995)
 Sylvia Ashley (1904–1977), English model, actress, and socialite born Edith Louisa Hawkes
 Thomas L. Ashley (1923–2010), American politician
 Tom Ashley (born 1984), New Zealand sailing champion
 William Ashley (disambiguation)